James Victor Downton, Jr. (born December 11, 1938, in Glendale, California, also known as Jim Downton) is a sociologist known for his research on charismatic leadership, activism, and new religious movements. He received his PhD from the University of California, Berkeley in 1968 with his thesis, Rebel leadership: revisiting the concept of charisma, a subject he developed more fully in his 1973 book, Rebel Leadership: Commitment and Charisma in the Revolutionary Process. He was the first to coin the term "transformational leadership", a concept further developed by James MacGregor Burns, and one of the key concepts in leadership research over the past 25 years. 

In 1982 Downton was a panel member of the Institute of Behavioral Science (Theda Skocpol States and Social Revolutions). In 1997 Downton was a reviewer for the American Sociological Review.

He taught for many years at the College of Arts and Sciences of the University of Colorado at Boulder, where he is now professor emeritus of sociology. In 1996, Downton received the Boulder Faculty Assembly Teaching Excellence Award. He was also one of the founders and director of the university's International and National Voluntary Service Training program (INVST). Following his retirement in 2004, the university established the Jim Downton Scholarship, awarded to two students each year in the Community Leadership Program.

Selected bibliography
Books
  Sacred journeys: The conversion of young Americans to Divine Light Mission  (1979) Columbia University Press. 
  Perspectives on Political Philosophy with David K  Hart (Eds.), Holt, Rinehart and Winston, Inc.; Volume II edition (1971), 
 Perspectives on Political Philosophy Volume I: Thucydides through Machiavelli
 Perspectives on Political Philosophy Volume II: Machiavelli to Marx
 Perspectives on Political Philoshopy. Vol. III: Marx Through Marcuse ,
 Rebel Leadership: Commitment and Charisma in the Revolutionary Process, Macmillan Pub Co (January 1973), 
 The Persistent Activist: How Peace Commitment Develops and Survives, with  Paul Ernest Wehr, Westview, (January 1997), 
 The Woo Way: A New Way of Living and Being (2003),  Green Dragon Books, 
  Playful Mind: Bringing Creativity to Life (2003), Green Dragon Books, 
 Awakening Minds: The Power of Creativity in Teaching (2003), Green Dragon Books, 
 Blooming: Teaching of a Woo Master(2005), Green Dragon Books, 
 Why Am I So DAMN Unhappy?: And What to Do About It (2008) Robert Reed Publisher, 
 Today, I will . . .Words to Inspire Life Changes, (2009) Blue Mountain Arts, 
 Screwing Up Love or How to Make Love Grow and Last (2013) Create Space,  
 Articles
 Individuation and Shamanism, The Journal of Analytical Psychology, 1989 
 Peace Movements: The Role of Commitment and Community in Sustaining Member Participation, Journal of Peace Research, Vol. 35, No. 5, 531-550 (1998) DOI 10.1177/0022343398035005001
 An Evolutionary Theory of Spiritual Conversion and Commitment: The Case of Divine Light Mission, Journal for the Scientific Study of Religion, Vol. 19, No. 4 (Dec., 1980), pp. 381-396, Blackwell Publishing
 Determinants of Commitment, Humanitas, Vol 8 (Feb. 1972) pp. 57-78

See also 
 Charisma
 Leadership

References

External links
James Downton faculty page, University of Colorado at Boulder.
'Faculty Focus on Jim Downton', Buffalo News Chips, Issue 4, Spring 2004, p. 2
 Personal website

American sociologists
American social sciences writers
University of Colorado alumni
Living people
1938 births